Irving Francis "Crip" Toomey (November 10, 1895 – June 28, 1961) was an American football and baseball player, coach of football and basketball, and college athletics administrator. He attended the University of California, Berkeley, where he played college football as a halfback on Andy Smith's California Golden Bears football teams from 1919 to 1921. Toomey served as the head football coach at the Northern Branch of the College of Agriculture—now known as the University of California, Davis (UC Davis)—from 1928 to 1936, compiling a record of 24–42–8. He was also the head basketball coach there from 1928 to 1936, tallying a mark of 55–89. Toomey served as the athletic director at UC Davis from 1928 until his death in 1961.

Toomey was born on November 10, 1895 in Fresno, California and attended Fresno High School. He served as a lieutenant in the United States Army during World War I. He died on June 28, 1961 at the Woodland Clinic Memorial Hospital in Woodland, California.

Head coaching record

Football

References

External links
 

1895 births
1961 deaths
American football halfbacks
Baseball catchers
Basketball coaches from California
California Golden Bears baseball players
California Golden Bears football players
UC Davis Aggies athletic directors
UC Davis Aggies football coaches
UC Davis Aggies men's basketball coaches
United States Army personnel of World War I
United States Army officers
Sportspeople from Fresno, California
Players of American football from California
Military personnel from California